Dicranopalpus is a genus of harvestmen with twelve known recent species. Three fossil species have been described, all from Baltic amber, but only D. ramiger is currently considered valid.

Name
The genus name refers to the peculiar form of the palps in at least the first described species, D. gasteinensis (and D. ramosus), derived from di "two", cranium "head", and palpus.

Species
 Dicranopalpus angolensis (Lawrence, 1951)
 Dicranopalpus bolivari (Dresco, 1949) (Venezuela)
 Dicranopalpus brevipes (I. Marcellino, 1974)
 Dicranopalpus caudatus (Dresco, 1948)
 Dicranopalpus cantabricus (Dresco, 1953)
 Dicranopalpus dispar (M. Rambla, 1967)
 Dicranopalpus fraternus (Szalay, 1950)
 Dicranopalpus gasteinensis (Doleschal, 1852) (Alps)
 Dicranopalpus insignipalpis (Simon, 1879) (Corsica)
 Dicranopalpus larvatus (Canestrini, 1874) (Italy)
 Dicranopalpus martini (Simon, 1878) (Portugal)
 Dicranopalpus pyrenaeus (Dresco, 1948) (France)
 Dicranopalpus pulchellus (Rambla, 1960)
 † Dicranopalpus ramiger (Koch & Berendt, 1854) (Baltic and Bitterfeld amber fossil)
 = † Dicranopalpus corniger (Menge, 1854)  (Baltic amber)
 = † Dicranopalpus palmnickensis (Roewer, 1939) (Baltic amber)
 Dicranopalpus ramosus (Simon, 1909) (Western Europe)

Further reading
 Starȩga, W. (2002): Baltic amber harvestmen (Opiliones) from Polish collections. Annales zoologici 52(4): 601-604.

Harvestmen
Baltic amber